Tracy Randolph Porter (born June 1, 1959) is a social activist, entrepreneur and former American football wide receiver. He played for the Detroit Lions and Baltimore/Indianapolis Colts in the National Football League (NFL). 

Porter studied Business Administration at Louisiana State University in 1983. He played college football for the LSU Tigers. He now serves as the CEO of Premiere Solutions, a fleet-management company based in California. 

Porter is on the executive committee of the Sigma Pi Phi fraternity where he heads the national initiative to increase African-American diversity on company boards and serves as the chairman of the board at the National Football League Alumni Association.

He is not related to former New Orleans Saints cornerback Tracy Porter, although the younger Porter is a native of Port Allen, Louisiana, which sits on the opposite bank of the Mississippi River from Baton Rouge,, the elder Porter's hometown and home to LSU.

References

1959 births
Living people
American football wide receivers
Detroit Lions players
Baltimore Colts players
Indianapolis Colts players
LSU Tigers football players